Odyssey: The Definitive Collection is a 2003 compilation album of works by Greek electronic composer and artist Vangelis. It includes two previously unreleased tracks: the opening theme from the film Cavafy and a new composition called "Celtic Dawn". All tracks were remastered.

Track listing 

Track listing note: on some editions, "L'Enfant" is misprinted as being from L'Apocalypse des Animaux.

Charts

Certifications

References

2003 compilation albums
Vangelis compilation albums
Universal Records compilation albums